Zeus! (with an exclamation mark) is an Italian progressive-math rock, supergroup duo formed in 2010 in Imola.

Biography 

The band began as a collaboration between Luca Cavina, bassist of Calibro 35, and Paolo Mongardi, former drummer of Jennifer Gentle.
In 2010 they released their first self-titled studio album, (involving the labels Bar la Muerte, Shove Records, Escape from Today) almost entirely instrumental, fusing hard sounds to complex lines of composition.

During the years 2009 to 2012 did many concerts around Italy, but also in Germany and France, dividing his time between commitments with their original groups.

In May 2011 was published the first official videoclip of the band, by the song Grindmaster Flesh, from the album Zeus!.

The project is also a strong characterization ironic and irreverent, also reflected by the titles of the songs, and the band's description on the Escape From Today website:

Personnel 

Luca Cavina (Calibro 35) – bass guitar, voice
Paolo Mongardi (former member of Jennifer Gentle) – drums

Discography
 2010 – Zeus! (Smartz Records, Bar La Muerte, SHOVE, Escape From Today, Offset)
 2013 – Opera (Santeria, Tannen Records, Offset)
 2015 – Motomonotono (Three One G Records, Tannen Records, Sangue Dischi)

The Zeus! album

The album is almost entirely instrumental, blending hard sounds with complex progressive compositions; In some songs there is the participation of Enrico Gabrielli of Calibro 35, the group in which plays Luca Cavina.

In May 2011 was published the first official videoclip of the band, of the song Grindmaster Flesh.

Track listing
 Suckertorte
 Grindmaster Flesh
 Koprofiev
 Giacomo Leopardi
 Steve Sylvester Saves
 Ate U
 Turbo Pascal
 Cowboia
 Golden Metal Shower

See also 

Calibro 35
Jennifer Gentle
Progressive rock
Noise Rock

References

Italian rock music groups